Riwoche is a county under the administration of the prefecture-level city of Chamdo in the Tibet Autonomous Region, China. The county lies in eastern Tibet and borders Qinghai province to the north. 

Riwoche is the name of the county, the county capital, and the small village where the main monastery is located. The Dzi River flows through the region. The county grows barley and wheat. Khampa inhabitants of the area lives in houses made of wood. The area is highly mountainous, and in contrast to the high altitude grasslands predominant in Tibetan Plateau, Riwoche is lush all year round with evergreen forests.

Climate

Attractions 

Yiri Hot Spring is  located at Riwoqê County, surrounded by the hills, is a famous hot spring which is reputed to cure diseases.

Riwoche is also home to the famous Riwoche Monastery, the main set of the Taklung Kagyu, situated 29 km north of the Riwoche Town, and 134 km west of Chamdo.
 
Jiumichan Monastery is within Riwoqê County, 105 km away from the county seat, is a national key scenic spot.

Naitang Monastery is located at Riwoqê County, with Dingxia Mountain on the back, Naishui River in the front, and Duoji Cliff on the north. Buddhists thought it as the holy land of Ruchi 16 Arhats, called it Naitang Monastery.

Riwoche horses  

Riwoche is also known for a unique horse breed called Riwoche horses, thought to be the missing link between modern horses and prehistoric horses after ground-breaking research in 1995.

Transportation
China National Highway 214
China National Highway 317

See also
Bangru (village)

References

Counties of Tibet
Chamdo
Kham